Meristella is an extinct genus of brachiopods found from the Late Silurian to the Late Devonian. They are characterized by a smooth oval shell and a prominent incurved beak on the pedicle valve. Meristella is placed in the family Meristellidae of the articulate brachiopod order Athyridida.

Related genera include Charionella, Meristelloides, and Pentagonia.

References

Further reading 
 R.C Moore 1952. Brachiopods, Ch 6. Moore, Lalicker, and Fischer. Invertebrate Fossils, McGraw-Hill.

Rhynchonellata
Prehistoric brachiopod genera
Devonian animals of North America
Devonian United States
Devonian animals of South America
Devonian Colombia
Fossils of Colombia
Silurian first appearances
Late Devonian animals
Devonian extinctions
Paleozoic life of Ontario
Floresta Formation
Paleozoic life of Manitoba
Paleozoic life of New Brunswick
Paleozoic life of Nova Scotia
Paleozoic life of Nunavut
Paleozoic life of Quebec
Paleozoic life of Yukon